The Hua Nan Bank Headquarters, also known as Hua Nan Bank World Trade Building, is a 154.5 m tall skyscraper built from 2011 to 2014 in Xinyi District, Taipei, Taiwan. 

The building houses offices on 27 floors and 2 basement levels served by a total of 10 elevators, with a total floor area of 52,131.74 m2. 

The building has been LEED Gold certified for its consideration of environmental issues and is designed by the Taiwanese architect Kris Yao.

See also
 List of tallest buildings in Taiwan
 List of tallest buildings in Taipei

References

2014 establishments in Taiwan
Office buildings completed in 2014
Skyscraper office buildings in Taipei
Banks of Taiwan
Bank headquarters in Taiwan